General elections were held in Peru on 18 May 1980 for the first time since 1963 to elect the President and both houses of the Congress. Former President Fernando Belaúnde Terry of the Popular Action won the presidential election with 44.9% of the vote, whilst his party emerged as the largest party in both houses of Congress.

Results

President

Senate

Chamber of Deputies

References

1980 in Peru
Elections in Peru
Peru
Presidential elections in Peru
May 1980 events in South America
Revolutionary Government of the Armed Forces of Peru